Celestine Onyeka Obi (born 2 June 1997) is a Nigerian footballer who plays as a striker.

Playing career
Celestine Onyeka Obi began his career with Ocean Boys in the 2011/2012 edition of the Nigerian Premier League.
However, Celestine signed with Turkish club Edirnespor in the summer of 2013.
Obi made the move from Edirnespor to 1461 İskele Trabzonspor in July 2015, signing a one-year with the Turkish club.
On 1 July 2018, Celestine signed for Turkish club Hakkari Sports.
After one season with Hakkari Sports, Obi returned to the Nigerian League in which he secured a move to Nigeria Professional Football League side Wikki Tourists.

References

External links
 Celestine Obi at Flashscore
 Celestine Onyeka Obi Profile  at the playersagent.com
 Celestine Onyeka Obi Profile  at Besoccer.com

1997 births
Living people
Nigerian footballers
Association football forwards
Wikki Tourists F.C. players
Nigerian expatriate footballers
Nigerian expatriate sportspeople in Turkey
Expatriate footballers in Turkey
Expatriate footballers in Cyprus